James Monroe Family Home Site, also known as James Monroe's Birthplace, is a historic archaeological site located near Oak Grove and Colonial Beach, Westmoreland County, Virginia.  The site includes the ruins of the Monroe Family Home and birthplace of U.S. Founding Father and President James Monroe, which were uncovered in 1976 by a team from the College of William & Mary. Monroe spent his entire youth working the farm until he left for his education at William & Mary, following which he served in the Continental Army. The archaeological team uncovered a house foundation measuring 20 feet by 58 feet. The known 1845 etchings of the birth home indicate a small four room, rough cut wooden farm house with few outbuildings on a 500-acre farm filled with wetlands.

It was listed on the National Register of Historic Places in 1979, with a boundary increase in 2008. Construction started in 2017 to build a replica of the Monroe home on the site and to create a walking path that highlights James Monroe's accomplishments; construction was projected to take two years, but is still ongoing in 2020.

References

External links

James Monroe Memorial Foundation website

1976 archaeological discoveries
Archaeological sites on the National Register of Historic Places in Virginia
Presidential homes in the United States
National Register of Historic Places in Westmoreland County, Virginia
Monroe family residences
Birthplaces of individual people
Homes of United States Founding Fathers